Balcha is a genus of chalcid wasps in the family Eupelmidae. There are about 16 described species in Balcha.

Species
These 16 species belong to the genus Balcha:

 Balcha anemeta (Walker, 1846) c g
 Balcha camptogastra Gibson, 2005 c g
 Balcha cylindrica Walker, 1862 c g
 Balcha dictyota Gibson, 2005 c g
 Balcha elegans (Masi, 1927) c g
 Balcha enoptra Gibson, 2005 c g
 Balcha eximia (Masi, 1927) c g
 Balcha eximiassita Gibson, 2005 c g
 Balcha indica (Mani & Kaul, 1973) c g b
 Balcha laciniosa Gibson, 2005 c g
 Balcha levicollis (Cameron, 1908) c g
 Balcha punctiscutum Gibson, 2005 c g
 Balcha reburra Gibson, 2005 c g
 Balcha reticulata (Nikol'skaya, 1952) c g
 Balcha reticulifrons Gibson, 2005 c g
 Balcha splendida (Girault, 1927) c g

Data sources: i = ITIS, c = Catalogue of Life, g = GBIF, b = Bugguide.net

References

Eupelmidae